"Never There" is a song by Canadian rock band Sum 41, written by Deryck Whibley. It was released as the third single from the album Order in Decline on June 18, 2019, a week after the release of the album's second single, "A Death in the Family".

Background
In an interview Deryck Whibley described the writing process, he said:

In an interview with Kerrang, he added that the song speaks not only of getting to know his father, but also of the link of a "something missing" that he alone can share in the world and how his mother managed to be such a good single mother.

Music video
The music video for the song was released on June 18, 2019, produced by Selfish Entertainment, and directed by John Asher. It features pro skateboarder Carl Jr Collins (better known as CJ Collins), actress Holly Lynch and the singer of the band, Deryck Whibley.

Personnel
 Deryck Whibley – lead vocals, rhythm guitar, piano, production, engineering, mixing
 Dave Baksh – lead guitar, backing vocals
 Tom Thacker – rhythm and lead guitars, backing vocals
 Jason McCaslin – bass guitar, backing vocals
 Frank Zummo – drums, percussion

Charts

References

2019 singles
2019 songs
Sum 41 songs
Rock ballads
Songs written by Deryck Whibley